The 2013–14 Rain or Shine Elasto Painters season was the eighth season of the franchise in the Philippine Basketball Association (PBA).

Key dates
November 3: The 2013 PBA Draft took place in Midtown Atrium, Robinson Place Manila.
February 7, 2014: Elasto Painters coach Yeng Guiao was served with a one-game suspension and missed Game 5 of the semifinals match-up between Rain or Shine and Petron.  Rain or Shine won the game though, 97–88 while Guiao was watching in his house, and the Elasto Painters book first finals spot.

Draft picks

Roster

Philippine Cup

Eliminations

Standings

Game log

Playoffs

Bracket

Commissioner's Cup

Eliminations

Standings

Game log

Playoffs

Bracket

Governors' Cup

Eliminations

Standings

Bracket

Game log

Transactions

Trades

Pre-season

Recruited imports

References

Rain or Shine Elasto Painters seasons
Rain or Shine